King Edward VI College (KEDST) is a selective state sixth form centre located in Stourbridge, England, in the West Midlands area.

It is situated in the centre of Stourbridge, to the north of the town centre, on the side of the ring road (A491). In 2017, the college was listed as 'good' following an inspection by Ofsted.

The college's motto is the same motto as that of the Order of the Garter. Translated from Old French it meant "Shame be to him who thinks evil of it".

History 
The original school was founded on 21 May 1430 and was known as the Chantry School of Holy Trinity. The charter for the grammar school was granted on 17 June 1552 by King Edward VI. It became a selective sixth form college in September 1976 due to the introduction of comprehensive education in the Dudley borough, which Stourbridge had been incorporated into 2 years earlier and most of the rest of the borough had followed suit with a year earlier.

In February 2021 the college converted to academy status, and is now sponsored by the Heart of Mercia Academy Trust.

Admissions 
The college is selective and students are accepted only on the condition of achieving high grades at GCSE level.

Students are generally from within the West Midlands, coming from as far afield as Birmingham, Wolverhampton and Worcester. Background education of most pupils is usually from state secondary schools, though there are many independent institutions in the area. For example, some pupils come from Elmfield Rudolf Steiner School and Old Swinford Hospital.

Campus
The college buildings are all on one site, on Lower High Street in Stourbridge. The campus is bound by the Ring Road, Coventry Street, adjacent shops on Lower High Street and the street itself, and a new housing development. All lessons take place on college grounds.

In 2018 the college opened the new Frank Foley Building, situated near Duke Street, at a cost of £3.5 million. This provides a new canteen for students, dance studio, drama suite and computer science and graphic design facilities. Additionally the new Henry Hickman Building at a cost of £1.8 million was completed in 2019, providing the college with a brand new Library and upstairs are new classrooms for Politics, History and Classical Civilisation.

A-Level & AS subjects

Students choose 3 or 4 subjects to study in the first year, year 12. At the end of year 12, students who studied 3 subjects carry all of these through to the second year, year 13, whilst most students studying 4 subjects in year 12 drop a subject. Students following a 3 subject programme have more time for enrichment activities and time to focus on the chosen courses in depth, whilst those students studying 4 subjects have flexibility when deciding which subject to drop. These are the courses taught at Kings Edward's, as of September 2021.

 Accounting
Applied Science (BTEC)
Biology
Business
Chemistry
Classical civilisation
Computer science
Criminology (Level 3 Applied Diploma)
Dance
Drama and theatre studies
Economics
English language & literature
 English literature
Film studies
Fine Art
French
Geography
 Geology
Graphic design
History early modern
History modern
History of art
Law
Mathematics
Mathematics with further maths
Media studies
Music
Philosophy
Physical education
Physics
Politics
 Psychology
Religious studies
Sociology
Spanish
Statistics
 Textiles

Old Edwardians

 Lydia Thompson plays Rugby Union for England
 Rob Hawthorne sports commentator for Sky Sports
 Richard Jones
 Dan O'Hagan sports commentator for BBC's Match of the Day
 Kenton Allen, producer of The Royle Family and the film "Six Shooter".
 Clint Mansell, English musician, composer, and former lead singer and guitarist of the band Pop Will Eat Itself.
 James Hand, BBC presenter and namer of Boaty McBoatface.
 Stephanie Peacock, MP for Barnsley East
 Esther Smith, actress 
 Nicola Richards, MP for West Bromwich East
 Councillor Simon Phipps, Dudley MBC 
 Philip Tibbetts, HM March Pursuivant Extraordinary - The Court of the Lord Lyon (2021-)

King Edward VI Grammar School for Boys, Stourbridge
 Anthony Bate, actor
 Mike Cooper-Slipper, Battle of Britain pilot and later test pilot in Canada for Orenda Engines
 Sir Michael Davies, judge
 Terry Davis, Secretary General of the Council of Europe and Labour MP for Bromsgrove from 1971 to 1974, Birmingham Stechford from 1979 to 1983 and Birmingham Hodge Hill from 1983 to 2004
 David Garrick, actor, playwright, theatre manager and producer. 
 Samuel Johnson, writer
 Alan Kennedy, professor of psychology from 1972-2006 at the University of Dundee
 Sir Ian Kennedy, chairman of the Healthcare Commission from 2004 to 2009
 Robin Morgan, editor of the Sunday Times from 1995 to 2009
 Sir Harry Pitt, vice-chancellor of the University of Reading from 1964 to 1979
 Robert Plant, lead singer of Led Zeppelin
 Richard Stanton-Jones, aeronautical engineer, rocket scientist, managing director of the British Hovercraft Corporation 1968-82.
 David Trotman, mathematician
 Sir Maurice Wilkes, computer scientist

References

Further reading

External links 
 

King Edward VI Schools
Education in the Metropolitan Borough of Dudley
Stourbridge
Academies in the Metropolitan Borough of Dudley
Learning and Skills Beacons
Educational institutions established in the 1550s
1552 establishments in England